Yusuf Corker (born December 26, 1998) is an American football safety for the Cincinnati Bengals of the National Football League (NFL). He played college football at Kentucky.

College career
Corker redshirted his true freshman season at Kentucky. He played in all 13 of the team's games as a reserve defensive back and on special teams as a redshirt freshman. Corker became a starter going into his redshirt sophomore season and led the team with 74 tackles. He was named second-team All-Southeastern Conference (SEC) as a redshirt junior. Corker recorded 81 tackles,  3.5 tackles for loss, and one sack with eight passes broken up as a senior.

Professional career

New York Giants
Corker was signed by the New York Giants as an undrafted free agent on April 30, 2022, shortly after the conclusion of the 2022 NFL Draft. He was waived on August 29.

Cincinnati Bengals
On September 1, 2022, the Cincinnati Bengals signed Corker to their practice squad. He signed a reserve/future contract on January 31, 2023.

References

External links
 New York Giants bio
Kentucky Wildcats bio

Living people
People from McDonough, Georgia
Players of American football from Georgia (U.S. state)
Sportspeople from the Atlanta metropolitan area
American football safeties
Kentucky Wildcats football players
New York Giants players
Cincinnati Bengals players
1998 births